Warm and Willing is the tenth studio album by American pop singer Andy Williams and was released in 1962 by Columbia Records. Allmusic's William Ruhlmann explained that Williams and producer Robert Mersey "followed the Sinatra concept-album formula of creating a consistent mood, in this case a romantic one, and picking material mostly from the Great American Songbook of compositions written for Broadway musicals in the 1920s and '30s by the likes of George and Ira Gershwin, then giving them slow, string-filled arrangements over which Williams could croon in his breathy, intimate tenor voice."

The album made its first appearance on Billboard magazine's Top LP's chart in the issue dated October 20 of that year and remained on the album chart for 44 weeks, peaking at number 16.

The single from the album, "Stranger on the Shore," made its debut on the Billboard Hot 100 chart four months prior, reaching number 38 during its seven-week stay. It performed even better on the magazine's Easy Listening chart, peaking at number 9.

The album was released on compact disc for the first time by Sony Music Distribution on December 28, 1999, as tracks 1 through 12 on a pairing of two albums on one CD with tracks 13 through 24 consisting of Williams's Columbia album from May 1966, The Shadow of Your Smile.    It was also released as one of two albums on one CD by Collectables Records on February 5, 2002, the other album being a 1966 compilation from Columbia entitled Andy Williams' Newest Hits. Collectables included this CD in a box set entitled Classic Album Collection, Vol. 2, which contains 15 of his studio albums and two compilations and was released on November 29, 2002.

Reception

Ruhlmann also thought the album "indicated that a singer who had flirted with many styles over the previous half-dozen years had settled down to something very familiar. His treatment of these standards was not definitive, by any means, but it was certainly effective, and Williams benefited from his association with such material."

Billboard was effusive in its praise. "This is one of the best albums Williams has done on his new label." They also wrote, "Helped muchly by the tender orchestral backing of the Bob Mersey crew, Williams turns in strong readings of each song."

Track listing

Side one
 "Embraceable You" from Girl Crazy (George Gershwin, Ira Gershwin) – 3:40
 "How Long Has This Been Going On?" from Rosalie (George Gershwin, Ira Gershwin) – 3:34
 "The Touch of Your Lips" (Ray Noble) – 3:09
 "I See Your Face Before Me" from Between the Devil (Howard Dietz, Arthur Schwartz) – 3:34
 "The Way You Look Tonight" from Swing Time (Dorothy Fields, Jerome Kern) – 3:36
 "If Ever I Would Leave You" from Camelot (Alan Jay Lerner, Frederick Loewe) – 3:38  (This track was replaced by "Then I'll Be Tired of You" on the U.K. release.)

Side two
 "My One and Only Love" (Robert Mellin, Guy Wood) – 3:49
 "Stranger on the Shore" (Acker Bilk) – 2:50
 "Warm All Over" from The Most Happy Fella (Frank Loesser) – 3:16
 "More Than You Know" from the 1929 musical Great Day (Edward Eliscu, Billy Rose, Vincent Youmans) – 3:26
 "Love Is Here to Stay" from The Goldwyn Follies (George Gershwin, Ira Gershwin) – 2:43
 "Warm and Willing" from the 1959 film A Private's Affair (Ray Evans, Jay Livingston, Jimmy McHugh) – 2:52

Personnel
From the liner notes for the original album:

Robert Mersey – arranger, conductor, producer
Andy Williams - vocals

References

Bibliography

1962 albums
Andy Williams albums
Columbia Records albums